As of February 2022, a total of five railroads operate in the U.S. state of Rhode Island. Freight services are largely operated by the Providence and Worcester Railroad, which interchanges with the state's only other freight railroad, the Seaview Transportation Company, a switching and terminal railroad serving the Port of Davisville. Passenger service is provided along Rhode Island's portion of the Northeast Corridor by Amtrak, supplemented by MBTA Commuter Rail service from Wickford Junction northbound towards Boston. Rhode Island is also home to one heritage railroad, the Newport and Narragansett Bay Railroad, which operates excursions on a segment of track on Aquidneck Island which is disconnected from the rest of the United States rail network.

Freight carriers

Passenger carriers

Defunct railroads

Electric

Bay State Street Railway
Fall River and Stone Bridge Street Railway
Groton and Stonington Street Railway
Middletown and Portsmouth Street Railway
Newport and Fall River Street Railway
Newport and Providence Railway
Newport Street Railway
Norwich and Westerly Railway
Old Colony Street Railway
Pawcatuck Valley Railway
Pawtucket Street Railway
Providence Cable Tramway Company (also a cable-car line)
Providence and Danielson Railway
Providence, Warren and Bristol Railroad
Rhode Island Company
Rhode Island Suburban Railway
Sea View Railroad
Union Railroad
United Electric Railways
Warwick Railway

Not completed
Southern New England Railway

Bibliography

Notes

References

See also
List of railroad lines in Rhode Island (a list of all corridors that have existed, not dealing with ownership changes)

 
 
Rhode Island
Railroads